Daniel Armando Ríos Calderón (born 22 February 1995) is a Mexican professional footballer who plays as a striker for Liga MX club Guadalajara.

Club career

C.D. Guadalajara
Ríos made his professional debut in a Copa MX match against Irapuato on 24 February 2015.

Loan at Coras
In December 2015, it was announced Ríos was sent out on loan to Ascenso MX club Coras de Tepic in order to gain professional playing experience. He scored a brace on his debut on 8 January 2015 against Murciélagos; the match ended in a 6–0 win.

Nashville SC
On 20 November 2018, Nashville MLS announced Ríos as their first signing for the 2020 MLS season. Nashville loaned Ríos to USL side Nashville SC for the 2019 season. In his initial season with the club, Ríos was named to the 2019 All-League First Team, notching 20 goals in just 31 matches. On 7 August 2019, Ríos scored a goal in the 56th minute in a 4–0 victory over Hartford Athletic, giving him goals in five consecutive games dating back to July 6. Less than two weeks later, on 18 August 2019, Ríos scored two goals against the Charlotte Independence to give Nashville a 3–1 win, earning him Man of the Match honors.

Ríos's 20 goals in the 2019 season, made him the first player in USL history to score 20 goals in multiple seasons.

Career statistics

Club

Honours
Guadalajara
Copa MX: Apertura 2015
Supercopa MX: 2016

Individual
USL Championship All League First Team: 2018, 2019

References

External links
 
 

1995 births
Living people
Footballers from Mexico City
Association football forwards
Mexican footballers
USL Championship players
North Carolina FC players
Nashville SC (2018–19) players
Nashville SC players
Major League Soccer players
Charlotte FC players
C.D. Guadalajara footballers